Sobków-Nida  is a colony in the administrative district of Gmina Sobków, within Jędrzejów County, Świętokrzyskie Voivodeship, in south-central Poland.

References 

Villages in Jędrzejów County